The Loves of Joanna Godden is a 1947 British historical drama film directed by Charles Frend and produced by Michael Balcon. The screenplay was written by H. E. Bates and Angus MacPhail from the novel Joanna Godden (1921) by Sheila Kaye-Smith.

It stars Googie Withers, Jean Kent, John McCallum, Derek Bond, Chips Rafferty and Sonia Holm. Some scenes were shot by director Robert Hamer when Frend was ill, though he was uncredited. The music was composed by Ralph Vaughan Williams.

Plot
In Edwardian Britain, a young woman has three suitors who seek her hand in marriage.

When Joanna Godden's father died, he bequeathed her a farm in Romney Marsh in Kent. Joanna is determined to run the farm herself. Her neighbour Arthur Alce (John McCallum), laughs at her ambitions, but loves her. Choosing a new shepherd, she allows physical attraction to a man to overcome her judgment as a farmer, and her scheme for cross-breeding sheep is unsuccessful. Her wealth gone, she turns to Arthur Alce for help - but not love. That she accepts from Martin Trevor (Derek Bond), a visitor from the world beyond the Marsh. But on the eve of their marriage, Martin dies.

Cast

Googie Withers  as Joanna Godden
Jean Kent       as Ellen Godden
John McCallum   as Arthur Alce
Derek Bond      as Martin Trevor
Henry Mollison  as Harry Trevor
Chips Rafferty  as Collard
Sonia Holm      as Louise
Josephine Stuart    as Grace Wickens
Frederick Piper as Isaac Turk
Douglas Jefferies as Huggett
and the people of Romney Marsh.

Production
The film was based on Joanna Godden, a novel by Sheila Kaye-Smith originally published in 1921. The book was popular enough for Kaye-Smith to write a sequel, Joanna Godden Married, published in 1926.

After World War Two, Ealing Studios decided to film the novel, with a screenplay written by H. E. Bates and Angus MacPhail. The film had an ending different from the novel.

The studio cast Googie Withers to star; she had been a hit in Pink String and Sealing Wax. Lead roles were given to Australians John McCallum, who had been put under long-term contract to Rank, and Chips Rafferty, who had just starred in The Overlanders for Ealing.

The casting of Withers and Kent was announced in July 1946. Filming took place in August and September 1946, with location filming in Kent.

Withers and McCallum fell in love during filming and later married. They named their first child "Joanna" in honour of the film.

References

External links

The Loves of Joanna Godden at BFI Screenonline
Review of film, at Variety

1947 films
Ealing Studios films
Films directed by Charles Frend
Films produced by Michael Balcon
Films set in the 1900s
Films scored by Ralph Vaughan Williams
Films set in Kent
British historical drama films
1940s historical drama films
British black-and-white films
1947 drama films
1940s English-language films
1940s British films